Maximino Arciniega Jr. is an American actor, best known for his portrayal of Domingo Gallardo "Krazy-8" Molina in the crime drama television series Breaking Bad and its spin-off/prequel Better Call Saul. 

A native of the Northwest side of Chicago, Arciniega graduated from the Columbia College Chicago. In 2020, he opened an acting school in Chicago.

Early life and career 
Maximino Arciniega was born in Chicago, Illinois to Mexican immigrants. He grew up in the Hermosa neighborhood in the northwest side of Chicago, and attended Steinmetz High School. He graduated from Columbia College Chicago with a B.A. in theater. Arciniega gained fame after playing drug dealer Krazy-8 in the first season of AMC crime drama Breaking Bad, a role he reprised in the spinoff/prequel series Better Call Saul. He has also made appearances in The Barber (2014), Hard Luck Love Song (2020), and Old Henry (2021). In 2020, Arciniega opened the MA School of Acting in Chicago.

Filmography

Film

Television

References 

Male actors from Chicago
Columbia College Chicago alumni
American television actors
American stage actors
Year of birth missing (living people)
Living people